Aleksa Dodić (born 28 January 1998) is a retired Serbian footballer.

Career statistics

Club

Notes

References

1998 births
Living people
Serbian footballers
Association football goalkeepers
Serbian First League players
Red Star Belgrade footballers
FK Jagodina players
FK Javor Ivanjica players